Call of Duty: Modern Warfare II is a 2022 first-person shooter game developed by Infinity Ward and published by Activision. It is a sequel to the 2019 reboot, and serves as the nineteenth installment in the overall Call of Duty series. It was released on October 28, 2022, for the PlayStation 4, PlayStation 5, Windows, Xbox One, and Xbox Series X/S.

Like its predecessor, the game takes place in a realistic and modern setting. The campaign follows multi-national special operations unit Task Force 141 and Mexican Special Forces unit Los Vaqueros as they attempt to track down Iranian Quds Force Major and terrorist Hassan Zyani, who is in possession of American-made ballistic missiles. Powered by a new version of the IW engine, Modern Warfare II continues to support cross-platform multiplayer and also features a free-to-play battle royale mode, Warzone 2.0, a follow-up to the original Warzone.

Modern Warfare II received generally favorable reviews from critics.  It was a commercial success and broke several records for the series, including becoming the fastest Call of Duty game to generate  in revenue.

Gameplay 
Modern Warfare II introduces several design improvements and changes to the series gameplay, such as advanced AI systems in the campaign and co-op modes, water physics, swimming mechanics, and an overhauled vehicle system. New gameplay features and movement tactics include dive to prone, mantle, and ledge hang along with the removal of slide canceling. New vehicle gameplay features include leaning out of vehicle windows, mantling onto a vehicle roof, and hijacking. The levelling and Gunsmith system has been revamped, allowing players to fine-tune specific attachments to suit their playstyles. It also offers weapon platforms that branch progression to reduce repetitiveness, as well as featuring a firing range for practice.

Modern Warfare II multiplayer features several new game modes: Knockout, in which two teams attempt to capture a package with limited lives; and Prisoner Rescue, in which an attacking team attempts to extract a hostage while a defending team prevents them by fortifying defenses around the hostage. Third-person game modes were confirmed in September 2022. The cooperative Special Ops mode also returns, featuring two-player missions, with an additional 3-player activity called Raids set to be released post-launch.

Like the previous game, Modern Warfare II features a free-to-play battle royale game mode called Warzone 2.0, which is introduced with the first seasonal content update for the game on November 16. In addition to the traditional battle royale mode, Warzone 2.0 also introduces DMZ, a new extraction game mode in which teams of trios battle against each other as well as AI combatants, while attempting to complete missions and extract loot from the playable map.

Plot

Characters and settings  
Modern Warfare II is a continuation of the 2019 reboot entry, with the campaign taking place in late 2022. The central protagonists of the game are Task Force 141, a multi-national special operations unit formed by SAS Captain John Price (Barry Sloane), comprising: Sergeant Kyle "Gaz" Garrick (Elliot Knight), Lieutenant Simon "Ghost" Riley (Samuel Roukin), and Sergeant John "Soap" MacTavish (Neil Ellice). Throughout the course of the story, Task Force 141 is supported by several allies: CIA Station Chief Kate Laswell (Rya Kihlstedt), Russian private military company leader "Nikolai" (Stefan Kapičić), Urzikstan Liberation Force Commander Farah Karim (Claudia Doumit), Mexican Special Forces Colonel Alejandro Vargas (Alain Mesa) and Sergeant Major Rodolfo "Rudy" Parra (Bayardo De Murguia), Shadow Company PMC Commander Phillip Graves (Warren Kole), and United States Army General Shepherd (Glenn Morshower). The primary antagonist of Modern Warfare II is Major Hassan Zyani (Ibrahim Renno), an Iranian Quds Force officer who is allied with the Urzik terrorist organization Al-Qatala, and is supported by the Las Almas Cartel. The cartel is controlled by sicaria Valeria Garza (María Elisa Camargo), who hides her identity using the alias "El Sin Nombre" (lit. Him without (a) name / The Nameless).

The game takes place in both real and fictional locations, such as fictional Mexican city of Las Almas, Amsterdam, Mexico–United States border, Gulf of Mexico, Chicago, Urzikstan, and the new United Republic of Adal (URA), the capital of which, Al Mazrah, serves as a major locale within the campaign and multiplayer modes, as well as the new map for the free-to-play Warzone 2.0. The game's plot is partly based on real-life events, such as the assassination of Qasem Soleimani.

The Special Ops and Multiplayer seasonal story takes place after the campaign, and features a cast of multi-national operators working under two major factions, SpecGru and KorTac Group, both of which are private military companies. Both factions undertake new covert operations, overseen by Laswell, taking place within the vicinity of Al Mazrah. Alex Keller (Chad Michael Collins), a protagonist of the Modern Warfare (2019) campaign and seasonal story, returns in the Special Ops Raid mode as a supporting character.

Synopsis

Campaign 
In July 2022, Task Force 141, under the command of General Shepherd, conduct surgical strikes against Russian-backed Iranian forces. An American ballistic missile strike assassinates Iranian General Ghorbrani during an arms deal in Al Mazrah. Several months later, his second-in-command, Quds Force Major Hassan Zyani, becomes involved in funding terrorist activity and seeks revenge on the United States. His activities draw the attention of Shepherd and CIA Station Chief Kate Laswell, who order US MARSOC Marines, led by Task Force 141 operatives Lieutenant Simon "Ghost" Riley and Sergeant John "Soap" MacTavish, to apprehend Hassan in Al Mazrah. Ghost and Soap fail to capture Hassan in time, but discover that he was in possession of an American ballistic missile.

Laswell and Task Force 141 operatives Captain John Price and Sergeant Kyle "Gaz" Garrick pursue one of Hassan's couriers in Amsterdam, learning that Hassan has received protection from and has allied with the Las Almas Cartel and is in Mexico. After a failed attempt to apprehend him at the US-Mexican border, Mexican Special Forces Colonel Alejandro Vargas and his second-in-command Sergeant Major Rodolfo "Rudy" Parra, alongside their unit Los Vaqueros, participate in a joint operation with Ghost, Soap, and Shadow Company, an elite secret unit of private military contractors under the direct command of Shepherd and led by its CEO, Commander Phillip Graves, to capture Hassan. Although successful, they are forced to release him to avoid political fallout.

Data hacked from Hassan's phone leads Price, Laswell, and Gaz to Cape Vilan, Spain, where they discover that Las Almas possessed Russian-made GPS devices for missiles. When Laswell is captured by Urzik terrorist group Al-Qatala, Price and Gaz track down and save her in Urzikstan, with the aid of their old allies "Nikolai" and Farah Karim. Meanwhile, Vargas and Soap manage to capture Las Almas leader, El Sin Nombre, revealed to be Vargas' former teammate Valeria Garza. Valeria reveals the location of the missiles, prompting a raid led by Task Force 141, Shadow Company and Vargas to prevent a missile launch. Despite the successful mission, Graves and Shadow Company betray Vargas and Task Force 141 under Shepherd's orders. Graves captures Vargas and seizes his base of operations, while Ghost and Soap flee. With help from Parra, Laswell, Price, and Gaz, Ghost and Soap free Vargas and the Los Vaqueros.

Laswell reveals that Shepherd and Graves were responsible for an illegal missile transportation mission in August meant to aid American allies in the Middle East. The transport was ambushed by a Russian PMC, with the three ballistic missiles being stolen, forcing Shepherd to cover up the mission's failure. Price confronts Shepherd over the revelations, promising to pursue him when threat is eliminated. Task Force 141 and Los Vaqueros succeed in retaking the latter's base and killing Graves, while also learning from Valeria that Hassan is in Chicago. The team thwarts Hassan's plan and kills him. In the aftermath, Shepherd has gone into hiding, while Laswell informs 141 of the new leader of the Russian Ultranationalists responsible for Shepherd's botched operation, whom Price identifies as Vladimir Makarov. 

In a mid-credits scene, a Russian terrorist cell prepares to hijack a plane. They receive a text from Makarov, who tells them not to speak Russian during the hijacking.

Special Ops 
Sometime after Hassan's death, Laswell starts to oversee new covert operations in Al Mazrah, in an effort to further undermine Al-Qatala activities.

In December 2022, Laswell tasks Price, Gaz, and Farah with investigating the disappearance of former CIA officer Alex Keller, who was sent by Farah alongside several ULF fighters to infiltrate a recently-discovered Soviet-era bunker in the Sattiq mountains in Urzikstan. They learn that the bunker houses a Soviet-made thermonuclear missile, while Farah's fighters were killed by Al-Qatala forces. The team heads further into the bunker and finds Alex alive, though the missile warheads were stolen. Alex reveals that Farah's brother, Hadir, has been acting as AQ's commander, and he left Alex alive to deliver a message: join him in his mission, or leave him be.

Development 
Call of Duty: Modern Warfare II was developed by Infinity Ward alongside a new version of the battle royale title Call of Duty: Warzone, later revealed to be titled Warzone 2.0, with both games using a new version of the IW engine, and will be under a single cross-game launcher known as Call of Duty HQ. The new upgraded engine features a physically based material system, a new hybrid tile-based streaming system, a new PBR decal rendering system, world volumetric lighting, 4K HDR, as well as a new GPU geometry pipeline. The game features Activision's proprietary Ricochet Anti-Cheat at launch.

It was reported that Modern Warfare II was initially intended to be the first mainline Call of Duty title to deviate from the series' annual release cycle, with Activision delaying the release of the next mainline Call of Duty project—led by developer Treyarch—to 2024, following Call of Duty: Vanguards failure to meet sales expectations. To help fill the gap between releases, Activision planned to ship an expansion pack for Modern Warfare II in late 2023, assigning developer Sledgehammer Games to lead the production of the project. The expansion was intended to feature a new single-player campaign that would continue the story of Modern Warfare II, along with new content for the game's multiplayer component. At some point during the development of the project, however, Activision chose to shift its direction, turning the expansion into a fully-fledged Call of Duty title. According to Bloomberg News, the new title is still intended to be released in Fall 2023, with plans to carry over content from Modern Warfare II'''s multiplayer component into the 2023 title.

 Music 
Sarah Schachner, the composer for the original score featured in Infinity Ward's previous two Call of Duty titles, Call of Duty: Infinite Warfare and Modern Warfare, returned to compose the score for Modern Warfare II. 

In November 2022, Schachner stepped away from the project, citing challenges in the working dynamic with Infinity Ward's audio director as the reason for her departure. In a statement released by her on Twitter, she noted that the contents of the official soundtrack release for Modern Warfare II are "not my artistic intent in regards to mixing and mastering”.

The soundtrack for Modern Warfare II was released digitally on November 25, 2022; featuring 23 tracks from the game's orignal score and two songs from artists Edison Flood, Destani Wolf, and Banda MS de Sergio Lizárraga.

 Marketing 
 Reveal 
In February 2022, Activision confirmed that a sequel to Call of Duty: Modern Warfare would be released later that year, alongside a new iteration of Call of Duty: Warzone. The game's title, Modern Warfare II, was revealed in April 2022. A month later, Activision released another teaser, which featured the key arts of the main characters of the game, as well as a release date of October 28, 2022. On June 2, 2022, a live-action trailer was released, on the same day, Steam responded to a tweet from the official Call of Duty Twitter account, strongly suggesting the game would be released on Microsoft Windows via the Steam platform, in addition to Battle.net. The first trailer for the game was released on June 8, showcasing gameplay from the campaign mode, as well as confirming the game's release on Steam, Battle.net, and the eighth and ninth generation consoles. Modern Warfare II marks the first time since 2017's Call of Duty: WWII that a Call of Duty title released on the Steam platform. In September 2022, Activision held the "Call of Duty Next" showcase where they revealed a multiplayer gameplay trailer, details on the Spec Ops mode, Call of Duty: Warzone 2.0, and the DMZ extraction game mode.

 Release 
The multiplayer beta for Modern Warfare II started for PlayStation 4 and PlayStation 5 players on September 16, and for Windows, Xbox One, and Xbox Series X/S players on September 22. The beta officially ended on September 26 at 3pm EDT across all platforms before the launch on October 28, 2022. Pre-orders of all editions grant "early" access to the open multiplayer beta. The Vault Edition grants access to a "Red Team 141" operator pack, a "FJX Cinder Weapon Vault" pack, plus access to the Battle Pass of a Season for Modern Warfare II (dependent on the time of purchase), and double XP tokens. In addition, the Vault Edition also includes the "Ghost Legacy Pack", which grants 12 Ghost operator skins and 10 weapon blueprints for the M4A1 assault rifle for use in Call of Duty: Modern Warfare and Call of Duty: Warzone. Unlike the previous cross-gen titles, Modern Warfare II offers no standard editions for the eighth generation consoles, but only a cross-gen edition for all platforms, in addition to the Vault Edition. Pre-ordering also granted early access to the campaign a week earlier on October 20.

 Post-launch content 
Similar to the previous titles, Modern Warfare II employs both the battle pass system and an in-game store where players can purchase cosmetic bundles using the "COD Points" microtransaction currency, while free content, such as new maps and weapons, are provided on a regular basis with "Season" updates.

In November 2022, Activision and Infinity Ward announced a football-themed limited time event for the Season 01 content update, "Modern Warfare FC", which features the addition of several world-renowned football athletes: Paul Pogba, Neymar, and Lionel Messi, as playable characters in both multiplayer modes and Warzone 2.0.

In March 2023, Activision and Infinity Ward revealed a collaboration with the Teenage Mutant Ninja Turtles franchise for Modern Warfare II's second mid-season update, featuring the character Shredder as a new playable operator.

 Reception Call of Duty: Modern Warfare II received "generally favorable" reviews, according to review aggregator Metacritic.GameSpot called the campaign "a greatest hits list for the series", praising the amount of player freedom in missions and the variety of locales, but criticizing the multiplayer's gun customization as overly complex and that the mode as a whole "[felt] lacking".

 Sales Call of Duty: Modern Warfare II became the fastest-selling Call of Duty game of all time. The game earned  in revenue in its first three days of release, and  within 10 days, surpassing the series previous record-holders, 2011's Call of Duty: Modern Warfare 3 and 2012's Black Ops II. It's the best-selling game of the US in 2022.

In the United Kingdom, Modern Warfare II became the best-selling game in its first week of release. In Japan, the PlayStation 4 version of Call of Duty: Modern Warfare II'' sold 24,371 physical copies within its release week, making it the second bestselling retail game of the week in the country. The PlayStation 5 version sold 17,710 physical copies in Japan throughout the same week, placing it at number six on the all-format video games sales chart.

Accolades 
The game received three nominations at the 19th British Academy Games Awards: Animation, Multiplayer and Performer in a Leading Role (Alain Mesa as Alejandro Vargas).

Notes

References

External links 
 

Activision games
Call of Duty
First-person shooters
PlayStation 4 games
PlayStation 5 games
Video game reboots
Video game sequels
2022 video games
Video games about the illegal drug trade
Video games about terrorism
Video games set in 2022
Video games set in the United States
Video games set in Arizona
Video games set in Mexico
Video games set in the Netherlands
Video games set in Amsterdam
Video games set in Chicago
Video games set in Singapore
Video games set in Spain
Video games set in the Middle East
Video games set in Afghanistan
Video games set in Russia
Video games set in Brazil
Video games set in New York City
Video games set in Pakistan
Video games set in Los Angeles
Video games set in Texas
Video games set in Switzerland
Works about Mexican drug cartels
Xbox One games
Xbox Series X and Series S games
Windows games
Infinity Ward games
Video games developed in the United States